Matthew Robert Ingram (born 18 December 1993) is an English professional footballer who plays as a goalkeeper for  club Hull City. He has previously played for Wycombe Wanderers, Lewes, Hayes & Yeading United, Oxford City, Northampton Town and Queens Park Rangers.

Career

Wycombe Wanderers
Ingram was born in High Wycombe, Buckinghamshire, and attended John Hampden Grammar School. Whilst still a first-year scholar, was called up to the first-team squad for the League Two match against Shrewsbury Town on 25 September 2010, appearing on the substitutes' bench. He was also selected for an England goalkeeping training camp in January 2011, and was the only representative from a League Two club to be included. A work experience spell with Isthmian League Premier Division club Lewes followed in early 2012, then in May 2012, Ingram signed his first professional contract, which was subsequently extended to run until the summer of 2015. Loan spells at Conference South club Hayes & Yeading United and Conference North club Oxford City followed during the 2012–13 season, following which the recall by Tottenham Hotspur of loanee keeper Jordan Archer saw Ingram make his first-team debut against Accrington Stanley on 29 March 2013.

Ingram began the 2013–14 season as Wycombe's first-choice goalkeeper. In the first competitive match of the season, Ingram kept a clean sheet as Wycombe beat Morecambe 1–0.

Ingram was voted the highest ranked goalkeeper in League Two in The Football League Awards for the 2014–15 season.

Queens Park Rangers
Ingram signed for Championship club Queens Park Rangers on 22 January 2016 on a four-and-a-half-year contract for an undisclosed fee. He rejoined Wycombe Wanderers on 15 November 2018 on a seven-day emergency loan as cover for the injured Ryan Allsop and Yves Ma-Kalambay.

Hull City
Ingram signed for Championship club Hull City on 25 June 2019 on a three-year contract with the option of a further year for an undisclosed fee. He made his debut in the first round of the EFL Cup in a 3–0 away win against Tranmere Rovers.

Ingram joined Championship club Luton Town on 1 May 2022 on an emergency seven-day loan as cover for the injured James Shea. He made his debut the following day against table-topping Fulham with Luton losing the match 7–0. With Luton reaching the play-off stage the loan spell was extended to 18 May, Ingram having to delay his honeymoon in doing so. He played in both legs of the play-off semi-final, in which Luton were beaten 2–1 on aggregate by Huddersfield Town.

On 18 May 2022, Hull exercised an option for an additional year on Ingram's contract. On 16 June, he signed a new three-year contract, with the club holding an option for a further year.

Career statistics

Honours
Hull City
EFL League One: 2020–21

References

External links

Profile at the Hull City A.F.C. website

1993 births
Living people
Sportspeople from High Wycombe
Footballers from Buckinghamshire
English footballers
Association football goalkeepers
Wycombe Wanderers F.C. players
Lewes F.C. players
Hayes & Yeading United F.C. players
Oxford City F.C. players
Queens Park Rangers F.C. players
Northampton Town F.C. players
Hull City A.F.C. players
Luton Town F.C. players
National League (English football) players
English Football League players
People educated at John Hampden Grammar School